The canada was the unit of liquid volume of the ancient Portuguese measurement system. It was used in Portugal, Brazil and other parts of the Portuguese Empire until the adoption of the metric system. It was equivalent to 4 quartilhos (pints). The exact value of the canada varied from region to region, the canada of Lisbon being equivalent to 1.4 litres.

In the Portuguese metric system officially adopted in August 1814, "canada" was the name given to the unit of liquid volume. This metric canada was equivalent to 1 litre. 

The canada is still used in some rural areas of Portugal and Brazil to indicate a liquid volume of between 1.5 and 2.0 liters.

References
Monteverde, Emilio Achilles, Manual Encyclopedico para Uzo das Escolas de Instrucção Primaria, Lisbon: Imprensa Nacional, 1861.
Dicionário Enciclopédico Lello Universal, Oporto: Lello & Irmão, 2002.
 Fátima Paixão, Fátima Regina Jorge, Success and constraints in adoption of the metric system in Portugal, The Global and the Local: History of Science and the Cultural Integration of Europe, 2006

See also
Portuguese customary units

Units of volume
History of Portugal